Nationality words link to articles with information on the nation's poetry or literature (for instance, Irish or France).

Events

Works published

Colonial America
 Ebenezer Cooke (both attributed; also, see "Deaths" section below; also spelled "Cook"):
 "An Elegy on [. . .] William Lock"
 "In Memory of [. . .] Benedict Leonard Calvert
 Joseph Green, "Parody of a Psalm by Byles", a parody of Mather Byles' poetry
 Richard Lewis:
 "A Description of Spring"
 "Carmen Saeculare"
 attributed, "A Rhapsody"

United Kingdom
 Anonymous, Castle-Howard, has been attributed to Anne Ingram, Viscountess Irwin
 Anonymous, Collection of Pieces
 Anonymous, The Gentleman's Study in Answer to the Lady's Dressing-Room, "By Miss W----" (a reply to Jonathan Swift's The Lady's Dressing-Room, also published this year)
 Robert Dodsley, A Muse on Livery; or, The Footman's Miscellany
 John Gay,Acis and Galatea: An English pastoral opera, Gay wrote the libretto for Handel's music
 George Granville, Lord Lansdowne, The Genuine Works in Verse and Prose
 William King, The Toast: An epic poem, although the book claimed to be a translation from the Latin of "Frederick Scheffer", it was an original work by King
 George Lyttelton, 1st Baron Lyttelton, The Progress of Love, published anonymously
 John Milton, Milton's Paradise Lost, edited by Richard Bentley
 Richard Savage:
 An Epistle to the Right Honourable Sir Robert Walpole
 Editor, A Collection of Pieces in Verse and Prose [...] Publish'd on Occasion of the Dunciad, including pieces by Edward Young, W. Harte and James Miller, together with four previously published pamphlets
 Jonathan Swift, The Grand Question Debated, published anonymously
 Jonathan Swift and Alexander Pope and others, Miscellanies: The Third Volume, in fact, it was the fourth volume (see Miscellanies 1727, 1735)
 Leonard Welsted, Of Dulness and Scandal
 Gilbert West, Stowe, anonymously published

Other
 Albrecht Haller, Attempt at Swiss Poems, German language, Switzerland
Heyat Mahmud, Sarbabhedbāṇī; Bengali language, Bengal Subah

Births
Death years link to the corresponding "[year] in poetry" article:
 February – Charles Churchill (died 1764), English poet and satirist
 February 21 – William Falconer (lost at sea c. 1770), Scottish poet

Deaths
Birth years link to the corresponding "[year] in poetry" article:
 March 20 – Johann Ernst Hanxleden (born 1681), German Jesuit priest, missionary in India and a Malayalam/Sanskrit poet, grammarian, lexicographer, and philologist
 March 29 (buried) – Jane Barker (born 1652), English-born poet and playwright
 July 3 (buried) – Mary Davys (born 1674), Irish poet and playwright
 December 4 – John Gay (born 1685), English poet and playwright
 Also – Ebenezer Cooke (also spelled "Cook"; born c. 1665), English Colonial American poet

See also

 Poetry
 List of years in poetry
 List of years in literature
 18th century in poetry
 18th century in literature
 Augustan poetry
 Scriblerus Club

Notes

 "A Timeline of English Poetry" Web page of the Representative Poetry Online Web site, University of Toronto

18th-century poetry
Poetry